The siege of Laon was a Frankish siege of the rebel Grifo's fortified city of Laon in 741. The Frankish army under the Mayors of the Palace, the brothers Carloman and Pepin the Short, besieged the fortress and took Grifo, the Mayors' half-brother, captive.

Prelude
The Frankish Mayor of the Palace Charles Martel died on 22 October 741. He was survived by three heirs, Carloman, Pepin the Short and Grifo, the latter the son of Charles Martel's second queen, the Bavarian Swanachild. Grifo was encouraged by Swanachild to take control of the entire kingdom. Grifo occupied the city of Laon and declared war on his brothers.

Siege
Carloman and Pepin mobilized an army, advanced on Laon and captured it after a siege. Grifo was taken prisoner.

Aftermath
The brothers went on to recover provinces that had broken away after Charles' death. Carloman imprisoned Grifo in Neufchâteau in the Ardennes to prevent further revolts at home while the brothers waged war abroad.

Citations

Bibliography
 
 

Laon 741
Laon
741
8th century in Francia
Wars of succession involving the states and peoples of Europe